The Hamilton Red Wings were a minor league baseball team based in Hamilton, Ontario. The team was a charter member of the Pennsylvania–Ontario–New York League (PONY League), which rebranded as the New York–Penn League upon the demise of the Hamilton franchise; Hamilton played within the league during the team's entire existence.

The club was founded in 1939 and was associated with the St. Louis Cardinals of the National League through the 1955 season. After missing three seasons during World War II, the franchise changed its name to the Hamilton Cardinals. In 1955 the Cardinals won the league championship. The team then reverted to the Hamilton Red Wings name for the 1956, however, on May 18, the Red Wings disbanded. Hamilton did not have another minor league baseball team until 1988, when the Hamilton Redbirds began play.

Year-by-year record

Baseball teams established in 1939
Baseball teams disestablished in 1956
Sports teams in Hamilton, Ontario
Baseball teams in Ontario
St. Louis Cardinals minor league affiliates
Defunct baseball teams in Canada
Defunct New York–Penn League teams
1939 establishments in Ontario
1956 disestablishments in Ontario